The World Congress On Information Technology (WCIT) 2019 is an information and communications technology (ICT) event which took place from October 6 to 9, 2019 in Yerevan, Armenia. The 23rd World Congress on IT featured discussions related to the evolution of the Digital Age. It included sessions on topics ranging from artificial intelligence, virtual reality, smart cities to cybersecurity, climate change, and more.

The 2019 World Congress had over 2000 delegates from 70 countries, with over 31 sponsoring organizations.

Overview  

The Congress has been organized since 1978 by the World Information Technology and Services Alliance (WITSA) and takes place every two years in different countries - since 2017 annually.

WCIT 2019 events and programs

Sunday, October 6th 
Pre-Opening Celebration: World's First AI Concert on Republic Square of Yerevan, Armenia, conductor Sergey Smbatyan and special guest Armin Van Buuren

Monday, October 7th  
Substantive Sessions WCIT 2019 Keynote Address

Tuesday, October 8th  
Substantive Sessions Ministerial Session

Wednesday, October 9th  
Substantive Sessions Genomics

Speakers 

Among the featured speakers were internationally recognized leaders from government and industry.

Business 

Alexander Yesayan, President of the Union of Advanced Technology Enterprises
Yvonne Chiu, Chairman of the World Information Technology and Servies Alliance

Government 

Nikol Pashinyan, Prime Minister of Armenia

Academia/Media/Other 

Kim Kardashian, American media personality, businesswoman, socialite, model and actress
Serj Tankian, Armenian-American musician, singer, songwriter, multi-instrumentalist, record producer, poet and political activist

Sponsors 

Government of Armenia
World Information Technology and Services Alliance (WITSA)
Union of Advanced Technology Enterprises

Partners 
The Government of Moscow
Picsart
Armenian General Benevolent Union (AGBU)

Palladium Sponsors 
Ucom
SoftConstruct
DigiTec Expo

Gold Sponsors 
Taiwan Excellence
Smart Taiwan
TeamViewer
Google

Silver Sponsors 
VMware
Ararat
Vahakni

Bronze Sponsors 
InecoBank
Codics
HachTech
Digitain
IUnetworks
Renderforest
Virtlo
Joomag
Storaket Architectural Studio
Pikasso
Adrack
Ardshinbank
Interprint
Coca-Cola
Digifield
Karas
Converse Bank
The Crowdfunding Formula
Sproot
HD Studio

Special Partner 
All.me
Multi Group Concern

Branding Partner 
Maeutica Branding Agency

Travel Partner 
Armenia Travel

Digital Marketing Partner 
MAROG Creative Agency

Gallery

See also 
Information and communications technology
World Information Technology and Services Alliance

References

External links 

WCIT 2019 web page
WCIT 2019's page on facebook

Information and communications technology
Events in Yerevan